The 2019 in cycling results is given as follows:

Cycle ball

International indoor cycling events
 May 31 & June 1: 2019 UEC Junior Indoor Cycling European Championships in  Geispolsheim
 Junior Women's winner:  Lorena Schneider
 Junior Pair winners:  (Alexander Brandl & Andreas Steger) (m) /  (Anika Papok & Anna-Sophia von Schneyder) (f)
 Junior Act 4 winners:  (Valerie Unternährer, Tina Schönenberger, Selina Niedermann, & Stefanie Haas)
 Junior Cycle Ball winners:  (Timon Fröhlich & Yannick Fröhlich)
 September 21: 2019 UEC U23 Cycle-Ball European Championships in  Wiesbaden-Naurod
 December 6 – 8: 2019 UCI Indoor Cycling World Championships (Artistic & Cycle-ball) in  Basel

2019 Artistic Cycling World Cup
 March 9: ACWC #1 in  Prague
 Elite Single Artistic Cycling winners:  Lukas Kohl (m) /  Milena Slupina (f)
 Women's Elite Pair Artistic Cycling winners:  (Sophie-Marie Nattmann & Caroline Wurth)
 Mixed Elite Pair Artistic Cycling winners:  (Serafin Schefold & Max Hanselmann)
 Mixed Elite Artistic Cycling ACT4 winners:  (Ramona Ressel, Julia Dörner, Annamaria Milo, & Anna-Lena Vollbrecht)
 May 25: ACWC #2 in  Merelbeke
 Elite Single Artistic Cycling winners:  Lukas Kohl (m) /  Milena Slupina (f)
 Women's Elite Pair Artistic Cycling winners:  (Selina Marquardt & Helen Vordermeier)
 Mixed Elite Pair Artistic Cycling winners:  (Patrick Tisch & Nina Stapf)
 Mixed Elite Artistic Cycling ACT4 winners:  (Lukas Kayko, Roxanne Ludwig, Vanessa Wörner, & Eva Zimmermann)
 August 10: ACWC #3 in  Bokod
 November 30: ACWC #4 (final) in  Erlenbach

2019 Cycle-Ball World Cup
 January 19: CBWC #1 in  Klein-Gerau
 Winners:  (Markus Bröll & Patrick Schnetzer)
 April 6: CBWC #2 in  Ailingen
 Winners:  (Markus Bröll & Patrick Schnetzer)
 April 27: CBWC #3 in  Albungen
 Winners:  (André Kopp & Raphael Kopp)
 May 18: CBWC #4 in  Mücheln
 Winners:  (Eric Haedicke & Max Rückschloß)
 August 31: CBWC #5 in  Grosskoschen
 Winners:  (Markus Bröll & Patrick Schnetzer)
 September 28: CBWC #6 in  Niedermehnen
 Winners:  (Markus Bröll & Patrick Schnetzer)
 October 12: CBWC #7 in  St. Gallen
 Winners:  (Bernd Mlady & Gerhard Mlady)
 November 2: CBWC #8 in  Höchst
 January 18, 2020: CBWC #9 (final) in  Möhlin

Cycling – BMX

2020 Summer Olympics
 October 12 & 13: Tokyo 2020 Test Event at the Olympic BMX Course in  Tokyo at Ariake Urban Sports Park
 Elite winners:  Romain Mahieu (m) /  Saya Sakakibara (f)
 Women's Junior winner:  Zoe Claessens

International BMX events
 January 19: 2019 Oceania BMX Continental Championships in  Te Awamutu
 Elite winners:  Kai Sakakibara (m) /  Saya Sakakibara (f)
 Junior winners:  Tasman Wakelin (m) /  Jessie Smith (f)
 July 13 & 14: 2019 UEC Juniors & Elite European Championships and European Challenge in  Valmiera
 Elite winners:  Niek Kimmann (m) /  Laura Smulders (f)
 Junior winners:  Ross Cullen (m) /  Zoe Claessens (f)
 July 23 – 28: 2019 UCI BMX World Championships in  Heusden-Zolder
 Elite winners:  Twan van Gendt (m) /  Alise Willoughby (f)
 Junior winners:  Tatyan Lui-Hin Tsan (m) /  Jessie Smith (f)

2019 UCI BMX Supercross World Cup
 April 27 & 28: SCWC #1 & #2 in  Manchester
 Men's Elite winners:  Joris Daudet (#1) /  Kye Whyte (#2)
 Women's Elite winners:  Simone Christensen (#1) /  Manon Valentino (#2)
 May 11 & 12: SCWC #3 & #4 in  Papendal
 Men's Elite winner:  Niek Kimmann (2 times)
 Women's Elite winners:  Judy Baauw (#1) /  Laura Smulders (#2)
 June 8 & 9: SCWC #5 & #6 in  Saint-Quentin-en-Yvelines
 Men's Elite winner:  Niek Kimmann (2 times)
 Women's Elite winners:  Laura Smulders (#1) /  Manon Valentino (#2)
 September 13 & 14: SCWC #7 & #8 in  Rock Hill
 Men's Elite winners:  Corben Sharrah (#1) /  Niek Kimmann (#2)
 Women's Elite winner:  Laura Smulders (2 times)
 September 28 & 29: SCWC #9 & #10 (final) in  Santiago del Estero
 Men's Elite winners:  Gonzalo Molina (#1) /  Niek Kimmann (#2)
 Women's Elite winner:  Laura Smulders (2 times)

2019 UEC BMX European Cup
 March 30 & 31: UEC BMX #1 & #2 in  Verona
 Elite winners:  Niek Kimmann (m; 2 times) /  Laura Smulders (f; 2 times)
 Men's Junior winner:  Bart van Bemmelen (2 times)
 Women's Junior winners:  Zoe Claessens (#1) /  Nadine Aeberhard (#2)
 April 20 & 21: UEC BMX #3 & #4 in  Heusden-Zolder
 Men's Elite winners:  Dave van der Burg (#1) /  Joris Harmsen (#2)
 Women's Elite winner:  Laura Smulders (f; 2 times)
 Men's Junior winners:  Ross Cullen (#1) /  Edvards Glazers (#2)
 Women's Junior winners:  Jessie Smith (#1) /  Zoe Claessens (#2)
 May 4 & 5: UEC BMX #5 & #6 in  Rade
 Men's Elite winners:  Eddy Clerte (#1) /  Tore Navrestad (#2)
 Women's Elite winners:  Paola Reis Santos (#1) /  Rebecca Petch (#2)
 Men's Junior winners:  Federico de Vecchi (#1) /  Robin Genestroni (#2)
 Women's Junior winner:  Malene Kejlstrup Sørensen (2 times)
 May 25 & 26: UEC BMX #7 & #8 in  Sarrians
 Men's Elite winner:  Sylvain André (2 times)
 Women's Elite winners:  Saya Sakakibara (#1) /  Manon Valentino (#2)
 Men's Junior winners:  Ryan Martin (#1) /  Bart van Bemmelen (#2)
 Women's Junior winners:  Zoe Claessens (#1) /  Jessie Smith (#2)
 August 31 & September 1: UEC BMX #9 & #10 (final) in  Peer
 Men's Elite winners:  Joris Harmsen (#1) /  Quillan Isidore (#2)
 Women's Elite winners:  Merel Smulders (#1) /  Christelle Boivin (#2)
 Men's Junior winners:  Edvards Glazers (#1) /  Bart van Bemmelen (#2)
 Women's Junior winners:  Zoe Claessens (#1) /  Malene Kejlstrup Sørensen (#2)

2019 UCI BMX Freestyle World Cup
 April 19 – 21: BMX FWC #1 in  Hiroshima
 Elite Park winners:  Brandon Loupos (m) /  Hannah Roberts (f)
 Elite Flatland winners:  Ryo Katagiri (m) /  Misaki Katagiri (f)
 May 29 – June 2: BMX FWC #2 in  Montpellier
 Elite Park winners:  Juatin Dowell (m) /  Hannah Roberts (f)
 Elite Flatland winners:  Dominik Nekolný (m) /  Misaki Katagiri (f)
 October 31 – November 3: BMX FWC #3 in  Chengdu

Cycling – Cyclo-cross

2018–19 International Cyclo-cross events
 November 3 & 4, 2018: 2018 Pan American Cyclo-cross Championships in  Midland
 Elite winners:  Curtis White (m) /  Maghalie Rochette (f)
 Men's Junior winner:  Magnus Sheffield
 U23 winners:  Gage Hecht (m) /  Clara Honsinger (f)
 November 3 & 4, 2018: 2018 UEC Cyclo-cross European Championships in  Rosmalen
 Elite winners:  Mathieu van der Poel (m) /  Annemarie Worst (f)
 Men's Junior winner:  Pim Ronhaar
 U23 winners:  Tom Pidcock (m) /  Ceylin del Carmen Alvarado (f)
 November 30 & December 1, 2018: 2018 UCI Masters Cyclo-cross World Championships in  Mol
 For detailed results, click here.
 February 2 & 3: 2019 UCI Cyclo-cross World Championships in  Bogense
 Elite winners:  Mathieu van der Poel (m) /  Sanne Cant
 Men's Junior winner:  Ben Tulett
 U23 winners:  Tom Pidcock (m) /  Inge van der Heijden (f)

2018–19 UCI Cyclo-cross World Cup
 September 23, 2018: CCWC #1 in  Waterloo
 Elite winners:  Toon Aerts (m) /  Marianne Vos (f)
 September 29, 2018: CCWC #2 in  Iowa City
 Elite winners:  Toon Aerts (m) /  Kaitlin Keough (f)
 October 21, 2018: CCWC #3 in  Bern
 Elite winners:  Mathieu van der Poel (m) /  Marianne Vos (f)
 Men's Junior winner:  Witse Meeussen
 Men's U23 winner:  Eli Iserbyt
 November 17, 2018: CCWC #4 in  Tábor
 Elite winners:  Mathieu van der Poel (m) /  Lucinda Brand (f)
 Men's Junior winner:  Witse Meeussen
 Men's U23 winner:  Tom Pidcock
 November 25, 2018: CCWC #5 in  Koksijde
 Elite winners:  Mathieu van der Poel (m) /  Denise Betsema (f)
 Men's Junior winner:  Pim Ronhaar
 Men's U23 winner:  Tom Pidcock
 December 23, 2018: CCWC #6 in  Namur
 Elite winners:  Mathieu van der Poel (m) /  Lucinda Brand (f)
 Men's Junior winner:  Ryan Cortjens
 Men's U23 winner:  Tom Pidcock
 December 26, 2018: CCWC #7 in  Heusden-Zolder
 Elite winners:  Mathieu van der Poel (m) /  Marianne Vos (f)
 Men's Junior winner:  Ryan Cortjens
 Men's U23 winner:  Eli Iserbyt
 January 20: CCWC #8 in  Pontchâteau
 Elite winners:  Wout van Aert (m) /  Marianne Vos (f)
 Men's Junior winner:  Thibau Nys 
 Men's U23 winner:  Tom Pidcock
 January 27: CCWC #9 (final) in  Hoogerheide
 Elite winners:  Mathieu van der Poel (m) /  Lucinda Brand (f)
 Men's Junior winner:  Witse Meeussen
 Men's U23 winner:  Eli Iserbyt

2018–19 Cyclo-cross Superprestige
 October 14, 2018: CCS #1 in  Gieten
 Elite winners:  Mathieu van der Poel (m) /  Annemarie Worst (f)
 Men's Junior winner:  Witse Meeussen
 October 20, 2018: CCS #2 in  Boom
 Elite winners:  Mathieu van der Poel (m) /  Kim van de Steene (f)
 Men's Junior winner:  Lennert Belmans
 October 28, 2018: CCS #3 in  Oostkamp-Ruddervoorde
 Elite winners:  Mathieu van der Poel (m) /  Marianne Vos (f)
 Men's Junior winner:  Witse Meeussen
 November 11, 2018: CCS #4 in  Gavere
 Elite winners:  Mathieu van der Poel (m) /  Alice Maria Arzuffi (f)
 Men's Junior winner:  Ryan Cortjens
 December 16, 2018: CCS #5 in  Zonhoven
 Elite winners:  Mathieu van der Poel (m) /  Sanne Cant (f)
 Men's Junior winner:  Ryan Cortjens
 December 30, 2018: CCS #6 in  Diegem
 Elite winners:  Mathieu van der Poel (m) /  Sanne Cant (f)
 Men's Junior winner:  Witse Meeussen
 February 10: CCS #7 in  Hoogstraten
 Elite winners:  Mathieu van der Poel (m) /  Sanne Cant (f)
 Men's Junior winner:  Thibau Nys
 February 16: CCS #8 (final) in  Middelkerke
 Elite winners:  Mathieu van der Poel (m) /  Denise Betsema (f)
 Men's Junior winner:  Witse Meeussen

2018–19 DVV Trophy
 November 10, 2018: DVV #1 in  Niel
 Elite winners:  Mathieu van der Poel (m) /  Sanne Cant (f)
 Men's Junior winner:  Dante Coremans
 Men's U23 winner:  Ben Turner
 November 18, 2018: DVV #2 in  Hamme
 Elite winners:  Mathieu van der Poel (m) /  Annemarie Worst (f)
 Men's Junior winner:  Thibau Nys
 Men's U23 winner:  Timo Kielich
 December 15, 2018: DVV #3 in  Antwerp
 Elite winners:  Mathieu van der Poel (m) /  Denise Betsema (f)
 Men's Junior winner:  Lars Boven 
 Men's U23 winner:  Niels Vandeputte 
 December 28, 2018: DVV #4 in  Loenhout
 Elite winners:  Mathieu van der Poel (m) /  Lucinda Brand (f)
 Men's Junior winner:  Ryan Cortjens
 Men's U23 winner:  Ben Turner
 January 1: DVV #5 in  Baal
 Elite winners:  Mathieu van der Poel (m) /  Jolanda Neff (f)
 Men's Junior winner:  Thibau Nys
 Men's U23 winner:  Ben Turner
 February 9: DVV #6 (final) in  Lille
 Elite winners:  Mathieu van der Poel (m) /  Sanne Cant (f)
 Men's Junior winner:  Thibau Nys
 Men's U23 winner:  Tom Pidcock

Cycling – Mountain Bike

2020 Summer Olympics
 October 4 – 6: Tokyo 2020 Test Event – Cycling Mountain Bike in  Izu (Izu Mountain Bike Course)
 Elite XCO winners:  Nino Schurter (m) /  Jolanda Neff (f)

International mountain biking events
 April 3 – 6: 2019 Pan American Mountain Bike Championships (XCO, XCE, & XCR) in  Aguascalientes City
 Elite XCO winners:  Raphaël Gagné (m) /  Kate Courtney (f)
 Elite XCE winners:  Jhon Fredy Garzon Gonzalez (m) /  Fatima Anahi Hijar Marin (f)
 Mixed Elite XCO Relay winners: 
 Junior XCO winners:  Adair Zabdiel Gutierrez Prieto (m) /  Natalia Marie Torres Macouzet (f)
 U23 XCO winners:  Christopher Blevins (m) /  Haley Batten (f)
 April 8 – 10: 2019 Oceania Mountain Bike Championships (XCO & DHI) in  Bright
 Elite XCO winners:  Anton Cooper (m) /  Rebecca Ellen McConnell (f)
 Elite Women's Downhill winner:  Sian A'Hern
 Junior XCO winners:  Corey Smith (m) /  Zoe Cuthbert (f)
 U23 XCO winners:  Matthew Dinham (m) /  Sarah Tucknott (f)
 May 4 & 5: 2019 European Mountain Bike Championships (DHI only) in  Pampilhosa da Serra
 Elite Downhill winners:  Baptiste Pierron (m) /  Camille Balanche (f)
 June 29: 2019 European Continental Championships (Ultra XCM only) in  Vielha e Mijaran-Val d'Aran
 Elite XCM winners:  Llibert Mill Garcia (m) /  Ramona Gabriel Batalla (f)
 July 25 – 28: 2019 European Continental Championships (XCE, XCO, & XCR) in  Brno
 Elite XCO winners:  Mathieu van der Poel (m) /  Jolanda Neff (f)
 Elite XCE winners:  Hugo Briatta (m) /  Gaia Tormena (f)
 Mixed Elite XCO Relay winners: 
 Junior XCO winners:  Lukas Malezsewski (m) /  Jacqueline Schneebeli (f)
 U23 XCO winners:  Vlad Dascalu (m) /  Sina Frei (f)
 August 1 & 2: 2019 UCI Mountain Bike World Championships (4X only) in  Val di Sole
 4X winners:  Romain Mayet (m) /  Romana Labounková (f)
 August 28 – September 1: 2019 UCI Mountain Bike World Championships (XCO, XCR, & DHI) in  Mont-Sainte-Anne
 Elite XCO winners:  Nino Schurter (m) /  Pauline Ferrand-Prévot (f)
 Elite Mixed Team XC Relay winners: 
 Elite E-MTB XC winners:  Alan Hatherly (m) /  Nathalie Schneitter (f)
 Elite Downhill winners:  Loïc Bruni (m) /  Myriam Nicole (f)
 Junior XCO winners:  Charlie Aldridge (m) /  Jacqueline Schneebeli (f)
 U23 XCO winners:  Vlad Dascalu (m) /  Sina Frei (f)
 Junior Downhill winners:  Kye A'Hern (m) /  Valentina Höll (f)
 September 21 & 22: 2019 UCI Mountain Bike Marathon World Championships in  Grächen
 Elite winners:  Héctor Leonardo Páez (m) /  Pauline Ferrand-Prévot (f)

2019 UCI Mountain Bike World Cup
 April 27 & 28: MBWC #1 (DHI only) in  Maribor
 Elite Downhill winners:  Loïc Bruni (m) /  Tahnée Seagrave (f)
 Junior Downhill winners:  Thibaut Daprela (m) /  Valentina Höll (f)
 May 18 & 19: MBWC #2 (XCO & XCC) in  Albstadt
 Elite XCO winners:  Mathias Flückiger (m) /  Kate Courtney (f)
 Elite XCC winners:  Mathieu van der Poel (m) /  Kate Courtney (f)
 U23 XCO winners:  Filippo Colombo (m) /  Laura Stigger (f)
 May 25 & 26: MBWC #3 (XCO & XCC) in  Nové Město na Moravě
 Elite XCO winners:  Mathieu van der Poel (m) /  Kate Courtney (f)
 Elite XCC winners:  Mathieu van der Poel (m) /  Chloe Woodruff (f)
 U23 XCO winners:  Vlad Dascalu (m) /  Haley Batten (f)
 June 1 & 2: MBWC #4 (DHI only) in  Fort William
 Elite Downhill winners:  Loris Vergier (m) /  Tracey Hannah (f)
 Junior Downhill winners:  Thibaut Daprela (m) /  Anna Newkirk (f)
 June 8 & 9: MBWC #5 (DHI only) in  Leogang
 Elite Downhill winners:  Loïc Bruni (m) /  Tracey Hannah (f)
 Junior Downhill winners:  Thibaut Daprela (m) /  Valentina Höll (f)
 July 6 & 7: MBWC #6 (XCO, XCC, & DHI) in  Vallnord-Pal Arinsal
 Elite XCO winners:  Nino Schurter (m) /  Anne Terpstra (f)
 Elite XCC winners:  Henrique Avancini (m) /  Jolanda Neff (f)
 Elite Downhill winners:  Loïc Bruni (m) /  Rachel Atherton (f)
 U23 XCO winners:  Vlad Dascalu (m) /  Ronja Eibl (f)
 Junior Downhill winners:  Matteo Iniguez (m) /  Valentina Höll (f)
 July 13 & 14: MBWC #7 (XCO, XCC, & DHI) in  Les Gets
 Elite XCO winners:  Nino Schurter (m) /  Kate Courtney (f)
 Elite XCC winners:  Mathieu van der Poel (m) /  Kate Courtney (f)
 Elite Downhill winners:  Amaury Pierron (m) /  Tracey Hannah (f)
 U23 XCO winners:  Vlad Dascalu (m) /  Ronja Eibl (f)
 Junior Downhill winners:  Thibaut Daprela (m) /  Valentina Höll (f)
 August 3 & 4: MBWC #8 (XCO, XCC, & DHI) in  Val di Sole
 Elite XCO winners:  Mathieu van der Poel (m) /  Pauline Ferrand-Prévot (f)
 Elite XCC winners:  Mathieu van der Poel (m) /  Jolanda Neff (f)
 Elite Downhill winners:  Laurie Greenland (m) /  Marine Cabirou (f)
 U23 XCO winners:  Vlad Dascalu (m) /  Ronja Eibl (f)
 Junior Downhill winners:  Tuhoto-Ariki Pene (m) /  Mille Johnset (f)
 August 10 & 11: MBWC #9 (XCO, XCC, & DHI) in  Lenzerheide
 Elite XCO winners:  Mathieu van der Poel (m) /  Jenny Rissveds (f)
 Elite XCC winners:  Mathieu van der Poel (m) /  Pauline Ferrand-Prévot (f)
 Elite Downhill winners:  Amaury Pierron (m) /  Marine Cabirou (f)
 U23 XCO winners:  Filippo Colombo (m) /  Martina Berta (f)
 Junior Downhill winners:  Seth Sherlock (m) /  Valentina Höll (f)
 September 7 & 8: MBWC #10 (XCO, XCC, & DHI) (final) in  Snowshoe Mountain
 Elite XCO winners:  Lars Forster (m) /  Pauline Ferrand-Prévot (f)
 Elite XCC winners:  Nino Schurter (m) /  Jenny Rissveds (f)
 Elite Downhill winners:  Danny Hart (m) /  Marine Cabirou (f)
 U23 XCO winners:  Filippo Colombo (m) /  Evie Richards (f)
 Junior Downhill winners:  Thibaut Daprela (m) /  Valentina Höll (f)

Cycling – Para-cycling
 Note: For all the results for the events below, click here.
 January 14 – 19: Asian Para Cycling Championships 2019 (Track) in  Jakarta
 March 14 – 17: 2019 UCI Para-cycling Track World Championships in  Apeldoorn
 May 9 – 12: 2019 UCI Para-cycling Road World Cup #1 (Road) in  Corridonia
 May 16 – 19: 2019 UCI Para-cycling Road World Cup #2 (Road) in  Ostend
 August 8 – 11: 2019 UCI Para-cycling Road World Cup #3 (Road) in  Baie-Comeau
 September 12 – 15: 2019 UCI Para-cycling Road World Championships in  Emmen

Cycling – Road

2019 Grand Tour events
 May 11 – June 2: 2019 Giro d'Italia
 Winner:  Richard Carapaz (first Giro d'Italia win & first Grand Tour win)
 July 6 – 28: 2019 Tour de France
 Winner:  Egan Bernal (first Tour de France win & first Grand Tour win)
 August 24 – September 15: 2019 Vuelta a España
 Winner:  Primož Roglič (first Vuelta a España win & first Grand Tour win)

International road cycling events
 Road Race winners:  Sirak Tesfom (m) /  Maroesjka Matthee (f)
 ITT Race winners:  Sirak Tesfom (m) /  Adiam Tesfalem (f)
 TTT Race winners:  (m) /  (f)
 March 15 – 17: 2019 Oceania Cycling Championships in 
 ITT winners:  Ben Dyball (m) /  Kate Perry (f)
 U23 ITT winners:  Liam Magennis (m) /  Sarah Gigante (f)
 Junior ITT winners:  Finn Fisher-Black (m) /  Francesca Sewell (f)
 Senior Road Race winners:  Ben Dyball (m) /  Sharlotte Lucas (f)
 U23 Road Race winners:  Tyler Lindorff (m) /  Sarah Gigante (f)
 Junior Road Race winners:  Finn Fisher-Black (m) /  Ella Wyllie (f)
 March 15 – 20: 2019 African Continental Road Cycling Championships in  Bahir Dar
 Senior Road Race winners:  Mekseb Debesay (m) /  Mossana Debesay (f)
 Men's Junior Road Race winner:  Renus Byiza Uhiriwe
 Senior ITT winners:  Stefan de Bod (m) /  Selam Amha Gerefiel (f)
 Senior TTT winners:  (m) /  (f)
 Junior TTT winners:  (m) /  (f)
 April 13 & 14: 2019 Elite Road Central American Championships in 
 Road Race winners:  Manuel Rodas (m) /  María José Vargas (f)
 ITT winners:  Manuel Rodas (m) /  Natalia Navarro Cerdas (f)
 April 23 – 28: 2019 Asian Cycling Championships in 
 Senior and ITT winners:  Yevgeniy Gidich (Road) &  Daniil Fominykh (ITT) (m) /  Olga Zabelinskaya (ITT) and (Road Race)) (f)
 Road Race U23 winners:  Mohammad Ganjkhanlou (f)
 Junior Road Race winners:  Tullatorn Sosalam (m) /  Sze Wing Lee (f)
 U23 ITT winners:  Yevgeniy Fedorov (m) /  Chuang Ting-ting (f)
 Men's Junior ITT winner:  Maxim Popugayev
 May 2 – 5: 2019 Pan American Road Cycling Championships in 
 Road Race winners:  Jefferson Cepeda (m) /  Ariadna Gutiérrez (f)
 Men's U23 Road Race winners:  Santiago Montenegro 
 ITT winners:  Brandon Smith Rivera (m) /  Leah Thomas (f)
 U23 ITT winners:  Diego Ferreyra (m) /  Teniel Campbell (f)
 August 7 – 11: 2019 European Road Championships in  Alkmaar
 Elite Road Race winners:  Elia Viviani (m) /  Amy Pieters (f)
 Elite ITT winners:  Remco Evenepoel (m) /  Ellen van Dijk (f)
 Junior Road Race winners:  Andrii Ponomar (m) /  Ilse Pluimers (f)
 Junior ITT winners:  Andrea Piccolo (m) /  Shirin van Anrooij (f)
 U23 Road Race winners:  Alberto Dainese (m) /  Letizia Paternoster (f)
 U23 ITT winners:  Johan Price-Pejtersen (m) /  Hannah Ludwig (f)
 Mixed Team Relay (TT) winners: The 
 September 22 – 29: 2019 UCI Road World Championships in  Harrogate
 Elite Road Race winners:  Mads Pedersen (m) /  Annemiek van Vleuten (f)
 Elite ITT winners:  Rohan Dennis (m) /  Chloé Dygert Owen (f)
 Mixed Relay winners: 
 Junior Road Race winners:  Quinn Simmons (m) /  Megan Jastrab (f)
 Junior ITT winners:  Antonio Tiberi (m) /  Aigul Gareeva (f)
 Men's U23 Road Race winner:  Samuele Battistella
 Men's U23 ITT winner:  Mikkel Bjerg

2019 UCI World Tour
 January 15 – 20:  2019 Tour Down Under Winner:  Daryl Impey
 January 27:  2019 Cadel Evans Great Ocean Road Race Winner:  Elia Viviani
 February 24 – March 2:  2019 UAE Tour Winner:  Primož Roglič
 March 2:  2019 Omloop Het Nieuwsblad Winner:  Zdeněk Štybar (Deceuninck–Quick-Step)
 March 9:  2019 Strade Bianche Winner:  Julian Alaphilippe (Deceuninck–Quick-Step)
 March 10 – 17:  2019 Paris–Nice Winner:  Egan Bernal
 March 13 – 19:  2019 Tirreno–Adriatico Winner:  Primož Roglič (Team Jumbo–Visma)
 March 23:  2019 Milan–San Remo Winner:  Julian Alaphilippe (Deceuninck–Quick-Step)
 March 25 – 31:  2019 Volta a Catalunya Winner:  Miguel Ángel López
 March 27:  2019 Three Days of Bruges–De Panne Winner:  Dylan Groenewegen (Team Jumbo–Visma)
 March 29:  2019 E3 BinckBank Classic Winner:  Zdeněk Štybar (Deceuninck–Quick-Step)
 March 31:  2019 Gent–Wevelgem Winner:  Alexander Kristoff
 April 3:  2019 Dwars door Vlaanderen Winner:  Mathieu van der Poel
 April 7:  2019 Tour of Flanders Winner:  Alberto Bettiol
 April 8 – 13:  2019 Tour of the Basque Country Winner:  Ion Izagirre (Astana Pro Team)
 April 14:  2019 Paris–Roubaix Winner:  Philippe Gilbert (Deceuninck–Quick-Step)
 April 16 – 21:  2019 Presidential Tour of Turkey Winner:  Felix Großschartner
 April 21:  2019 Amstel Gold Race Winner:  Mathieu van der Poel (Corendon–Circus)
 April 24:  2019 La Flèche Wallonne Winner:  Julian Alaphilippe (Deceuninck–Quick-Step)
 April 28:  2019 Liège–Bastogne–Liège Winner:  Jakob Fuglsang (Astana Pro Team)
 April 30 – May 5:  2019 Tour de Romandie Winner:  Primož Roglič (Team Jumbo–Visma)
 May 1:  2019 Eschborn–Frankfurt Winner:  Pascal Ackermann (Bora–Hansgrohe)
 May 12 – 18:  2019 Tour of California Winner:  Tadej Pogačar (UAE Team Emirates)
 June 9 – 16:  2019 Critérium du Dauphiné Winner:  Jakob Fuglsang (Astana Pro Team)
 June 15 – 23:  2019 Tour de Suisse Winner:  Egan Bernal
 August 3:  2019 Clásica de San Sebastián Winner:  Remco Evenepoel (Deceuninck–Quick-Step)
 August 3 – 9:  2019 Tour de Pologne Winner:  Pavel Sivakov (Team Ineos)
 August 4:  2019 RideLondon–Surrey Classic Winner:  Elia Viviani (Deceuninck–Quick-Step)
 August 12 – 18: / 2019 BinckBank Tour Winner:  Laurens De Plus (Team Jumbo–Visma)
 August 25:  2019 EuroEyes Cyclassics Winner:  Elia Viviani (Deceuninck–Quick-Step)
 September 1:  2019 Bretagne Classic Ouest–France Winner:  Sep Vanmarcke (EF Education First Pro Cycling)
 September 13:  2019 Grand Prix Cycliste de Québec Winner:  Michael Matthews
 September 15:  2019 Grand Prix Cycliste de Montréal Winner:  Greg Van Avermaet
 October 12:  2019 Il Lombardia Winner:  Bauke Mollema
 October 17 – 22:  2019 Tour of Guangxi Winner:  Enric Mas (Deceuninck–Quick-Step)

2019 UCI Women's World Tour
 March 9:  2019 Strade Bianche Women Winner:  Annemiek van Vleuten (Mitchelton–Scott)
 March 17:  2019 Ronde van Drenthe Winner:  Marta Bastianelli (Team Virtu Cycling Women)
 March 24:  2019 Trofeo Alfredo Binda-Comune di Cittiglio Winner:  Marianne Vos (CCC Liv)
 March 28:  2019 Three Days of Bruges–De Panne Winner:  Kirsten Wild (WNT–Rotor Pro Cycling)
 March 31:  2019 Gent–Wevelgem Winner:  Kirsten Wild (WNT–Rotor Pro Cycling)
 April 7:  2019 Tour of Flanders for Women Winner:  Marta Bastianelli (Team Virtu Cycling Women)
 April 21:  2019 Amstel Gold Race Winner:  Katarzyna Niewiadoma (Canyon–SRAM)
 April 24:  2019 Flèche Wallonne Winner:  Anna van der Breggen (Boels–Dolmans)
 April 28:  2019 Liège–Bastogne–Liège Winner:  Annemiek van Vleuten (Mitchelton–Scott)
 May 9 – 11:  2019 Tour of Chongming Island Winner:  Lorena Wiebes (Parkhotel Valkenburg Cycling Team)
 May 16 – 18:  2019 Tour of California Winner:  Anna van der Breggen (Boels–Dolmans)
 May 22 – 25:  2019 Emakumeen Euskal Bira Winner:  Elisa Longo Borghini (Trek–Segafredo)
 June 10 – 15:  2019 The Women's Tour Winner:  Lizzie Deignan (Trek–Segafredo)
 July 5 – 14:  2019 Giro Rosa Winner:  Annemiek van Vleuten (Mitchelton–Scott)
 July 19:  2019 La Course by Le Tour de France Winner:  Marianne Vos (CCC Liv)
 August 3:  Prudential RideLondon Classique Winner:  Lorena Wiebes (Parkhotel Valkenburg Cycling Team)
 August 17:  Postnord UCI WWT Vårgårda WestSweden TTT Winners: Team Trek–Segafredo
 August 18:  2019 Postnord UCI WWT Vårgårda West Sweden Winner:  Marta Bastianelli (Team Virtu Cycling Women)
 August 22 – 25:  2019 Ladies Tour of Norway Winner:  Marianne Vos (CCC Liv)
 August 31:  GP de Plouay – Lorient Agglomération Trophée WNT Winner:  Anna van der Breggen (Boels–Dolmans)
 September 3 – 8:  2019 Holland Ladies Tour Winner:  Christine Majerus (Boels–Dolmans)
 September 14 & 15:  2019 Madrid Challenge by la Vuelta Winner:  Lisa Brennauer (WNT–Rotor Pro Cycling)
 October 22:  Tour of Guangxi Women's WorldTour race Winner:  Chloe Hosking (Alé–Cipollini)

Cycling – Track

International track cycling events
 August 2 – 7, 2018: 2018 UEC European Track Championships in  Glasgow
  won the gold medal tally.  won the overall medal tally.
 August 15 – 19, 2018: 2018 UCI Junior Track Cycling World Championships in  Aigle
  and  won 4 gold medals each.
 August 21 – 26, 2018: 2018 UEC European U23 & Junior Track Championships in  Aigle
  won the gold medal tally.  won the overall medal tally.
 August 29 – September 2, 2018: 2018 Pan American Track Cycling Championships in  Aguascalientes City
  won the gold medal tally.  won the overall medal tally.
 October 6 – 13, 2018: 2018 UCI Masters Track Cycling World Championships in  Los Angeles
 For detailed results, click here.
 For the complete results book (483 pages in .pdf form), click here. 
 October 10 – 13, 2018: 2019 Oceania Track Championships in  Adelaide
  won both the gold and overall medal tallies.
 January 9 – 13: 2019 Asian Track Championships in  Jakarta
  and  won 6 gold medals each. South Korea won the overall medal tally.
 February 27 – March 3: 2019 UCI Track Cycling World Championships in  Pruszków
  and  won 6 gold medals each. The Netherlands won the overall medal tally.

2018–19 UCI Track Cycling World Cup
 October 19 – 21, 2018: TCWC #1 in  Saint-Quentin-en-Yvelines
 Keirin winners:  Yuta Wakimoto (m) /  Laurine van Riessen (f)
 Madison winners:  (Lasse Norman Hansen & Michael Mørkøv) (m) /  (Amalie Dideriksen & Julie Leth) (f)
 Omnium winners:  Albert Torres (m) /  Kirsten Wild (f)
 Points Race winners:  Moritz Malcharek (m) /  Maria Giulia Confalonieri (f)
 Scratch Race winners:  Stefan Matzner (m) /  Ashlee Ankudinoff (f)
 Sprint winners:  Matthew Glaetzer (m) /  Lee Wai Sze (f)
 Men's Team Pursuit winners:  (Julius Johansen, Lasse Norman Hansen, Rasmus Pedersen, & Casper von Folsach)
 Men's Team Sprint winners:  (Roy van den Berg, Jeffrey Hoogland, & Sam Ligtlee)
 Women's Team Pursuit winners:  (Kristina Clonan, Ashlee Ankudinoff, Georgia Baker, & Macey Stewart)
 Women's Team Sprint winners:  (Gazprom–RusVelo Team) (Daria Shmeleva & Anastasia Voynova)
 October 26 – 28, 2018: TCWC #2 in  Milton, Ontario
 Keirin winners:  Jason Kenny (m) /  Madalyn Godby (f)
 Madison winners:  (Casper von Folsach & Julius Johansen) (m) /  (Katie Archibald & Elinor Barker) (f)
 Omnium winners:  Benjamin Thomas (m) /  Laura Kenny (f)
 Scratch Race winners:  Vitaliy Hryniv (m) /  Aleksandra Goncharova (f)
 Sprint winners:  Matthew Glaetzer (m) /  Lee Wai Sze (f)
 Men's Team Pursuit winners:  (Casper von Folsach, Lasse Norman Hansen, Julius Johansen, & Rasmus Pedersen)
 Men's Team Sprint winners:  (Nils van 't Hoenderdaal, Harrie Lavreysen, & Jeffrey Hoogland)
 Women's Team Pursuit winners:  (Laura Kenny, Katie Archibald, Elinor Barker, & Ellie Dickinson)
 Women's Team Sprint winners:  (Kaarle McCulloch & Stephanie Morton)
 November 30 – December 2, 2018: TCWC #3 in  Berlin
 Keirin winners:  Matthijs Büchli (m) /  Laurine van Riessen (f)
 Madison winners:  (Lasse Norman Hansen & Casper von Folsach) (m) /  (Laura Kenny & Emily Nelson) (f)
 Omnium winners:  Sam Welsford (m) /  Katie Archibald (f)
 Sprint winners:  Matthew Glaetzer (m) /  Stephanie Morton (f)
 Men's Team Pursuit winners:  (Alexander Porter, Sam Welsford, Leigh Howard, & Kelland O'Brien)
 Women's Team Pursuit winners:  (Katie Archibald, Laura Kenny, Emily Nelson, & Emily Kay)
 Men's Team Sprint winners:  (Nils van 't Hoenderdaal, Harrie Lavreysen, & Jeffrey Hoogland)
 Women's Team Sprint winners:  (Gazprom–RusVelo Team) (Daria Shmeleva & Anastasia Voynova)
 Men's 1 km Time Trial winner:  Joachim Eilers
 Women's 500 m Time Trial winner:  Olena Starikova
 December 14 – 16, 2018: TCWC #4 in  London
 Keirin winners:  Matthijs Büchli (m) /  Stephanie Morton (f)
 Madison winners:  (Julius Johansen & Casper von Folsach) (m) /  (Katie Archibald & Laura Kenny) (f)
 Omnium winners:  Matthew Walls (m) /  Kirsten Wild (f)
 Sprint winners:  Harrie Lavreysen (m) /  Stephanie Morton (f)
 Men's Team Pursuit winners:  (Huub Wattbike Test Team) (John Archibald, Daniel Bigham, Ashton Lambie, & Jonathan Wale)
 Women's Team Pursuit winners:  (Katie Archibald, Ellie Dickinson, Neah Evans, & Laura Kenny)
 Men's Team Sprint winners:  (Roy van den Berg, Harrie Lavreysen, & Matthijs Büchli)
 Women's Team Sprint winners:  (Lin Junhong & Zhong Tianshi)
 January 18 – 20: TCWC #5 in  Cambridge
 Keirin winners:  Eddie Dawkins (m) /  Lee Wai Sze (f)
 Madison winners:  (Campbell Stewart & Aaron Gate) (m) /  (Jolien D'Hoore & Lotte Kopecky) (f)
 Omnium winners:  Claudio Imhof (m) /  Annette Edmondson (f)
 Scratch Race winners:  Christos Volikakis (m) /  Martina Fidanza (f)
 Sprint winners:  Nathan Hart (m) /  Lee Wai Sze (f)
 Men's Team Pursuit winners:  (Regan Gough, Campbell Stewart, Jordan Kerby, & Nicholas Kergozou)
 Men's Team Sprint winners:  (Ethan Mitchell, Sam Webster, & Eddie Dawkins)
 Women's Team Pursuit winners:  (Racquel Sheath, Bryony Botha, Rushlee Buchanan, & Kirstie James)
 Women's Team Sprint winners:  (Holy Brother Cycling Team) (SONG Chaoru & BAO Shanju)
 January 25 – 27: TCWC #6 (final) in 
 Keirin winners:  Theo Bos (m) /  Lee Wai Sze (f)
 Madison winners:  (Thomas Sexton & Campbell Stewart) (m) /  (Kirsten Wild & Amy Pieters) (f)
 Omnium winners:  Cameron Meyer (m) /  Kirsten Wild (f)
 Scratch Race winners:  GUO Liang (m) /  Martina Fidanza (f)
 Sprint winners:  Thomas Clarke (m) /  Lee Wai Sze (f)
 Men's Team Pursuit winners:  (Liam Bertazzo, Francesco Lamon, Filippo Ganna, & Davide Plebani)
 Men's Team Sprint winners:  (Matthew Richardson, Thomas Clarke, & James Brister)
 Women's Team Pursuit winners:  (Elisa Balsamo, Letizia Paternoster, Martina Alzini, & Marta Cavalli)
 Women's Team Sprint winners:  (Lin Junhong & Zhong Tianshi)

National cycling events

 in  Tachikawa, Tokyo
 December 28: 2019 
   (y)
 December 29: 2019 
   (f)
 December 30: 
   (m)

Cycling – Trials

International Trial cycling events
 October 4 – 6: 2019 UCI Trials European Championships in  Barga
 Men's 20" winners:  Dominik Oswald (Elite) /  Charlie Rolls (Junior)
 Men's 26" winners:  Jack Carthy (Elite) /  Oliver Widmann (Junior)
 Women's Elite Open winner:  Nina Reichenbach
 November 6 – 10: UCI Trials World Championships in  Chengdu
 Men's Junior 20" winner:  Charlie Rolls 
 Men's Junior 26" winner:  Oliver Widmann
 Women's Elite Open winner:  Nina Reichenbach

2019 UCI Trials World Cup
 July 5 – 7: Trials WC #1 in  Salzburg
 Men's Elite 20" winner:  Alejandro Montalvo Milla 
 Men's Elite 26" winner:  Jack Carthy 
 Women's Elite Open winner:  Vera Baron Rodriguez
 August 23 – 25: Trials WC #2 in  Val di Sole
 Men's Elite 20" winner:  Thomas Pechhacker
 Men's Elite 26" winner:  Jack Carthy
 Women's Elite Open winner:  Nina Reichenbach
 October 11 – 13: Trials WC #3 in  Barga
 Men's Elite 20" winner:  Borja Conejos Vazquez
 Men's Elite 26" winner:  Jack Carthy
 Women's Elite Open winner:  Vera Baron Rodriguez

References

External links
 Union Cycliste Internationale – UCI – Official Site

 
2019 in sports
Cycle sport by year
2019 sport-related lists